The 2004 season of the Bhutanese A-Division was the tenth recorded season of top-flight football in Bhutan. The league was won by Transport United, their first title. Transport United were Bhutan's representatives in the 2005 AFC President's Cup.

References

Bhutan A-Division seasons
Bhutan
Bhutan
1